Bowling for Soup  (abbreviated as BFS) is an American rock band formed in Wichita Falls, Texas, in 1994. The band consists of Jaret Reddick (lead vocals, guitar), Chris Burney (guitar, backing vocals), Gary Wiseman (drums, percussion, backing vocals), and Rob Felicetti (bass, backing vocals, acoustic guitar). The band is best known for its singles "Girl All the Bad Guys Want", "1985", "Almost" and "High School Never Ends". The band is also known for performing the theme song for the Disney Channel TV show Phineas and Ferb and the vocal theme for Sonic Unleashed.

History

Early years
Bowling for Soup has its origins in Wichita Falls, Texas, where Jaret Reddick and other members of the band grew up. Reddick and original drummer Lance Morrill met in the fall of 1976, then reconnected in kindergarten in the fall of 1977. Reddick began playing music in 1985, at 13 years old. Reddick and guitarist Chris Burney knew each other in high school (they met in 1986) and as students in the 1980s, they grew up on the commercially successful heavy metal music of bands such as Quiet Riot, RATT, and Mötley Crüe, but were also influenced by the faster punk rock of the Ramones and later Green Day. Burney's family owned a Wichita Falls coffeehouse called "The Refuge" with a music stage and he played there with his first band the Persecuted, where he and Reddick met bassist Erik Chandler and drummer Gary Wiseman in the early 1990s (although Wiseman did not join the band until 1998).

Burney and Chandler soon formed the Folkadots, while Wiseman formed Gary & the Wiseman. Burney and Chandler, along with Morrill, also formed the band Slaw. Around this time, Reddick formed the band Terminal Seasons. Not too long after, Reddick and Morrill formed coolfork! which Burney later joined. The band was in full swing by 1993, playing such venues as the Refuge. A few months later, after forming a band called Rubberneck, the group changed their name to Bowling for Soup, which was derived from a comedy act by Steve Martin, and the band was officially formed in Wichita Falls on June 4, 1994, by Reddick (lead vocals, guitar), Burney (guitar, backing vocals), Chandler (bass, backing vocals, acoustic guitar), and Morrill (drums, percussion, backing vocals). Morrill left the band on good terms and was replaced in July 1998 by Wiseman.

In 1996, Bowling for Soup relocated to Denton, Texas, and in 1998 recorded their second studio album (and third overall), Rock on Honorable Ones!! for the Denton music label FFROE. The group released its first EP, Tell Me When to Whoa, through FFROE later that year. The album sold over 10,000 copies, prompting Jive Records to sign the band. As a side project, beginning around 1999 until May 2018, Reddick and Chandler performed acoustic shows at smaller venues and showcases, playing primarily Bowling for Soup songs in an acoustic fashion, billed as Jaret & Erik. Beginning in September 2017, Reddick began performing solo acoustic shows, starting with the Heartache & Hilarity tour in the UK.

2000s

Drunk Enough to Dance and A Hangover You Don't Deserve
Let's Do It for Johnny!!, Bowling for Soup's major label debut, was released on Jive in 2000. The album mostly contained re-recordings of the group's previous material along with a few new tracks and a cover of Bryan Adams' song "Summer of '69". Drunk Enough to Dance is Bowling for Soup's second album with Jive Records, released August 6, 2002. It was recorded at Tree Sound Studios and Sonica Recording in Atlanta and Big Time Audio in Dallas. One of the album's two singles, "Girl All The Bad Guys Want" (the other single was "Emily"), was nominated for a Grammy Award in 2003 in the "Best Pop Performance by a Duo or Group with Vocal" category. Reddick considers the Grammies one of his shining moments, not for the nomination, but for winning "worst dressed" in Time magazine.

A re-release in 2003 added "Punk Rock 101", a cover of the 1980s new wave band A Flock of Seagulls' "I Ran (So Far Away)", and "Star Song". An acoustic version of the song "Belgium" exists at the end of the album, as well as at the very end of the initial release. The cover of "I Ran (So Far Away)" was used as the opening theme song of the anime television show Saint Seiya: Knights of the Zodiac in North America.

The band appeared in the 2002 film Crossroads, playing at a graduation party.

A Hangover You Don't Deserve followed two years later, and has become the band's only Top 40 album. Sales of the album were driven in large part by the radio airplay of the single "1985", a song written by Mitch Allan of SR-71 and covered by Bowling For Soup with his permission.  Bowling for Soup did make some modifications to the lyrics to better fit their style with Mitch Allan, lead vocalist of SR-71, contributed backing vocals to the song and appeared in the music video. "1985" became Bowling for Soup's biggest hit in the U.S., reaching No. 23 on the Billboard Hot 100. A second single from A Hangover You Don't Deserve, "Almost", charted on the UK Singles Chart, No. 46 on the U.S. Top 100, and No. 23 on U.S. Pop 100. "Ohio", better known as "Come Back to Texas", was released as a radio single in the U.S., but was not as popular as "1985" or "Almost", reaching only No. 59 on the U.S. Pop 100.

Bowling for Soup Goes to the Movies, StarJam, and The Great Burrito Extortion Case
Bowling for Soup Goes to the Movies, a compilation album of cover songs and contributions to movie soundtracks, was released by the band in 2005. Later that year, Reddick and Burney made several appearances on VH1's I Love the '90s: Part Deux. Bowling for Soup appeared briefly at the start of the 2005 film Cursed, playing the song "Li'l Red Riding Hood".

The group went on the Star 102.1 StarJam tour with Simple Plan in 2006 and were the opening act, performing "Almost", "Trucker Hat", "Girl All the Bad Guys Want", "1985", "Punk Rock 101", "I Melt With You", and more. The group's cover version of Modern English's "I Melt With You" was used in the Disney movie Sky High and was on the movie's soundtrack. A music video of the song was made for the movie, aired on the Disney Channel and can be found on the movie's DVD. Once more Bowling for Soup was at StarJams 2007 with Quietdrive and Army of Freshmen.

Following the release of the band's covers album, Bowling for Soup spent most of 2006 readying The Great Burrito Extortion Case, the group's seventh album, which was released on November 7, 2006. The group released the first single from that album, "High School Never Ends", to iTunes on September 19, 2006. The UK release of the album was on February 5, 2007.

The band released "I'm Gay" as the second UK single in early 2007. The release was on CD and 7" vinyl. A music video for the single was released in the UK, made up of live performances of the song from the "Get Happy Tour", of which the band had performed in the UK during February 2007. On September 25, 2007, it was announced on the official Bowling for Soup forums that "When We Die" would be released as a download only single in the UK on October 22, 2007, as the third single. Following this, the music video was added to the Kerrang television playlist and was played on Scuzz TV.
The group created an album (also on the label Jive) called On Your Mark... Get Set... Smoke a Cigarette which consisted of three songs: "Bipolar", "Somebody Get My Mom", "Li'l Red Riding Hood".

DirecTV, Download Festival 2007, and live album

Bowling for Soup produced an hour-long special that airs on DirecTV's concert series and made an appearance at the Download Festival at Donington Park, England. Bowling for Soup cowrote and sang the theme song for Disney's Phineas and Ferb, "Today Is Gonna Be A Great Day". The group briefly appears in one episode of Phineas and Ferb, called "Phineas and Ferb's Quantum Boogaloo". "Greatest Day" was the opening song to the Nickelodeon film The Last Day of Summer.

The band's first live DVD, Bowling for Soup: Live and Very Attractive was filmed over the course of the UK Get Happy Tour October 2007 and premiered at the AFI Dallas International Film Festival with the DVD released in the summer. A three-disk edition was released in the UK on July 7, 2008. There was a limited edition pre-order deal for the DVD which included a T-shirt, drinks mug, exclusive poster and more besides the DVD. Reddick sang lead vocals and Chandler sang backing vocals for the song "Endless Possibility" for the video game Sonic Unleashed.

Sorry for Partyin and other releases
On January 20, 2009, Reddick released a video onto the web via the band's Myspace page and both YouTube accounts about a new album by the group. According to him, the band's eighth full-length album was set to be released in September 2009, and the band had very recently started recording. He said it was to be titled Sorry for Partyin. The video was the first of a few released during the recording process of the album.

Sorry for Partyin was released on October 12, 2009. "My Wena" was the first promotional single from the album. The single was first previewed on May 5, 2009, on the Lex and Terry show. A music video for the song was filmed and the video was released on July 21, 2009. The song was released to iTunes on July 28, 2009. "No Hablo Ingles" was supposed to be the first single released to the radio for the album, however, Jive split with the band and shelved Sorry for Partyin after only four weeks of being on sale, thus no single was ever released to radio.

Bowling for Soup released Merry Flippin' Christmas Volume 1 digitally on November 26, 2009.

The band is also set to film a three-part documentary entitled Bowling for Soup: My Home Town.

2010s

Fishin' for Woos and One Big Happy

Bowling for Soup released an acoustic album, Jaret & Erik 2010 UK Acoustic Tour Limited Edition CD, during Reddick and Chandler's acoustic tour in the UK in April 2010. The album was released after the tour on the band's online UK and US stores. Reddick has also stated that an acoustic album is very possible for the group's next acoustic tour, which was planned for April 2011, but nothing came of it.

In an interview, Reddick said that after the band's current tour concluded he would begin writing material for a new record. Reddick confirmed May 8 on his Twitter account the band would start recording an eleventh album in June 2010. On June 2, an update was posted on the band's website stating that the group had entered the studio and begun recording the album. The band announced that a new album was to be released in Spring 2011.
Merry Flippin' Christmas Volume 1 was released on iTunes and CD, the band's first two albums were re-released Legacy Recordings released a greatest hits album, Playlist: The Very Best of Bowling for Soup, on January 25, 2011, as part of the label's Playlist music album series. The band played what is said to be the first single off Fishin' for Woos, "S-S-S-Saturday" (also known as "Saturday Night"), live on ABC for the Professional Bowlers Association Tournament of Champions finals on January 22. The album was ultimately released April 25, 2011, in the United Kingdom, and April 26 worldwide. In July 2011, the band released a 7" split EP with The Dollyrots, in which each band covered one of the other band's songs. Reddick said the band had plans to release a lot of other music in 2011: "We are re-releasing our first 3 albums and working on another Christmas album. Chandler will release a solo record. And my new band, People on Vacation, will release our first album. We are also trying to get a b-sides comp together. It is gonna be a great year!". In October 2011, Bowling for Soup released a three-track single that included the new single "I've Never Done Anything Like This", which features Kay Hanley on vocals from Fishin' for Woos, as well as a re-recorded version of "The Bitch Song" and a cover version of "Stacy's Mom" by Fountains of Wayne.

On September 8, the band performed at the Tennessee Soybean Festival in Martin, Tennessee. On September 25, the band released a split album with The Dollyrots and Patent Pending called One Big Happy, where the bands perform covers of each other's songs.

Lunch. Drunk. Love. and Songs People Actually Liked
On February 15, 2013, the band started a pledge music campaign to fund a new album, and Reddick stated: "The Writing Process has Begun". Pledgers got to hear the songs just as they were finished. The first song to be written was "Since We Broke Up", by Linus of Hollywood and Reddick. On April 8, 2013, Bowling for Soup announced that the group's last tour of the UK would take place in October of the same year, but they toured the UK again in February 2016, February 2018 and February 2020.

Reddick also announced in a video posted online that the band was scheduled to record a new cover album, as well as a greatest hits album after the 2013 Farewell UK Tour and preceding the band's 20th anniversary in June 2014.

On June 11, 2013, Reddick announced via the band's PledgeMusic Project page it was up to the pledgers to vote on what the newest album should be named. On June 20, 2013, it was announced the title with the most votes was Lunch. Drunk. Love. The album was released to the pledgers on September 6, 2013, in both clean and explicit formats and the pledge campaign was temporarily extended, allowing effective purchase of the album for $10.

As part of Bowling for Soup's 20th anniversary, Reddick, Burney, Chandler, and Wiseman decided to make a greatest hits album. The band once again turned to PledgeMusic to source funding for the project. The album is titled Songs People Actually Liked Volume 1 The First 10 Years and includes seventeen re-recorded songs and one new song. This album is seen by the band members as their true 'Greatest Hits' (from the group's first 10 years) as the previously released 2011 greatest hits album was released with no consultation from the band or fans. The album was released to PledgeMusic subscribers on November 19, 2014. One critic wrote, "Bowling for Soup's energetic, humorous music is just as good today as it was when it was released."

In 2015, Bowling for Soup appeared on Blues Traveler's album Blow Up the Moon, co-writing the songs "Right Here Waiting For You" and "I Know, Right".

Drunk Dynasty and Chandler's departure 
The band announced on May 11, 2016, that they would begin to record a new EP, Drunk Dynasty. The band would again team up with PledgeMusic to include fans in the entire recording process. The band later announced that Drunk Dynasty was to be a full-length studio album. It was eventually released on October 14, 2016. On December 20, 2019, the band released "A Nice Night For An Evening, Vol 1", a piano compilation album of their hits to Spotify.

On January 12, 2019, Reddick took to the band's official Facebook page to confirm fans' speculation that Chandler had left the band due to personal reasons after not performing in some time. Chandler was replaced with long time friend, Rob Felicetti (Patent Pending/The Ataris).

Bowling for Soup and fellow pop-punk band Simple Plan joined together for the UK tour "Together Again, You're Welcome Tour" along with supporting act Not Ur Girlfrenz.

2020s 

"Alexa Bliss", a single about WWE wrestler Alexa Bliss, was released on February 7, 2020. The music video stars her as herself.

In October 2020 the band had planned and announced a "Surf the UK Tour" in 2021 with Lit and the Dollyrots but they were forced to cancel due to the Covid-19 pandemic. The tour was rescheduled to begin in April 2022.

The band shared their new single "Getting Old Sucks (But Everybody's Doing It)" in May of 2021.
Later that year they released another song "Killin' 'Em With Kindness".

Pop Drunk Snot Bread and other releases 
New single "I Wanna Be Brad Pitt" premiered on Tulsa's The Edge radio station on January 13, 2022. With the official release of the song on February 25 the band also revealed their eleventh album titled Pop Drunk Snot Bread, which was released on April 22, 2022.

On February 14, 2023, the band announced a cover of the Miley Cyrus song “Flowers”, set to be released on February 21.

Musical style and influences
Bowling for Soup's musical style has been described as pop punk, pop rock, alternative rock, and power pop. AllMusic describes Bowling for Soup's style as a "catchy and humorous blend of power pop, ska, punk, and hardcore." Bowling for Soup's influences include Green Day, Bad Religion, Ramones, NOFX, Descendents, Elvis Costello, and Willie Nelson.

Tours

The Get Happy Tour

The Get Happy Tour was set up as a joint venture with Bowling for Soup and Army of Freshmen.  The original tour was planned with Bowling for Soup headlining, Army of Freshmen opening and two other bands (Punchline and Lucky Boys Confusion) playing between.  The tour kicked off in Austin, Texas on June 23, 2006, with The Vanished taking Lucky Boys Confusion's spot for the first three dates.  The band toured the U.S. over the summer and autumn of 2006 with the Get Happy Tour and ended on August 27, 2006, in Amarillo, Tex. This was followed by a UK tour in early February 2007. Coinciding with this UK tour was the UK release of "High School Never Ends". The tour included Bowling for Soup as main headliners, Wheatus, Son of Dork and Army of Freshmen on the 12 date trek, which concluded at Hammersmith Palais in London, on the February 18.

Bowling for Soup confirmed during the Get Happy Tour that the group would be performing another tour of the UK in October 2007, called the Get Happy Tour 2, gracing the U.S. over the summer and featuring support acts Melee, Quietdrive, and Army of Freshmen. The UK tour bands were confirmed at the Download Festival (Army of Freshmen who played in the morning announced it first, and Bowling for Soup announced it later that afternoon), along with the lineup in Kerrang! on an advertisement poster for the new tour. The lineup consisted of Bowling for Soup, Bloodhound Gang, Zebrahead and Army of Freshmen.

The Party in Your Pants Tour
To promote the release of Sorry for Partyin', Bowling for Soup embarked on a headline tour of the UK in October 2009 under the title of The Party in Your Pants Tour. Main support on the tour came from Zebrahead, with additional support coming from MC Lars (who is signed to Reddick's Crappy Records) and the Leftovers. During the last show of this tour at the Camden Town Roundhouse in London Reddick announced to the crowd that Bowling for Soup would return to the UK in "The Spring" and will be hitting the European summer festival circuit and then again returning to the UK for another headlining tour in the Autumn. On Christmas Eve 2009, Bowling for Soup announced through the band's website, a UK Acoustic Tour in April 2010.

Annual UK Acoustic Tour
After the first acoustic tour of the UK in 2010 featuring Jaret & Erik and support act Bob Schneider was deemed a huge success, Jaret & Erik returned to the UK in March 2011 for a second acoustic tour. The tour began on April 1, 2011, at The Junction in Cambridge and concluded on April 15, 2011, at Koko in London, playing fifteen shows in total. On this tour, the support acts were Erik Chandler and the Mulberry St. Socialites (Chandler's side project), People on Vacation (Reddick's side project) and longtime Bowling for Soup collaborator Linus of Hollywood. During Bowling for Soup's headline sets. Linus would also join the band for a few songs on the keyboard. Reddick announced there would be a 3rd Annual UK Acoustic Tour, the tour began on March 26, 2012, at The Roadmender in Northampton and conclude on April 1, 2012, at Koko in London, playing a total of 7 shows.  On this tour, the support acts were Erik Chandler and the Mulberry St. Socialites and People on Vacation. Due to Bowling for Soup starting on the group's newest album, Reddick announced that there would be no acoustic tour during the usual March/April time slot in 2013, however Reddick and Chandler announced that they would be playing their final UK Acoustic show on October 9 in London at the Union Chapel prior to the full band tour.

For the military
In 2011 Bowling for Soup played at four US Navy Bases, three in Japan: Sasebo on July 2, Yokosuka on July 4 and Okinawa on July 13. Diego Garcia NSF in British Indian Ocean Territory was part of the Armed Forces Entertainment tour for the band, to help kick off July 4 Celebrations for the troops. The first three dates were part of the Independence Day Celebration. During February and March 2012 Reddick & Chandler also traveled to the Middle East and Africa to perform some acoustic shows at US Military bases throughout the region.

2012 U.S. Tour
On February 27, Bowling for Soup announced that a headlining a tour of the Midwest and Northeast of the U.S. Accompanying them was Patent Pending and Freshman 15. The tour started in Lawrence, Kansas, on April 18 and ended in Dallas on May 5.

2013 Farewell UK Tour

In an announcement video posted on the band's official YouTube account, Reddick announced that the annual 14-day UK tour would go ahead in October 2013, but that it would be the last UK tour the group perform as Bowling for Soup. Reddick cited personal and financial reasons for the decision, saying that: "The UK has given this band everything, so I'm being honest about our reasons. We still love being Bowling For Soup but touring really does begin to take its toll on both you and your family after a while." No Ireland dates were announced for the tour, which only featured one support act (Patent Pending) as opposed to two, with an extended Bowling for Soup setlist and exclusive acoustic concert for VIP ticket holders preceding the concert. The band also stressed that the group "are not splitting up", but at the current time, there are no plans for a farewell US tour. Reddick also announced two new albums were to be recorded in early 2014 – a covers album and a re-recorded greatest hits album preceding the band's 20th anniversary in June 2014.

Bowling for Soup returned to the UK in June 2014 to perform twice at Castle Donington's Download Festival 2014.  The group performed twice, in the afternoon on the main stage, which involved them sacrificing an inflatable sheep. Later on in the evening the band performed an acoustic set on the Jägermeister Acoustic Stage.

2016 How About Another Round UK Tour
On June 15, 2015, Bowling for Soup announced a 15-day UK tour.

2018 Get Happy Tour
In September 2017, the band announced that they would be returning to the UK the following February with a tour to celebrate the 15th anniversary of their seminal album Drunk Enough to Dance, accompanied by Get Happy Tour alumni Army of Freshmen (who celebrated their 20th anniversary as a band), and The Aquabats. The tour visited a number of large venues across the UK including O2 Apollo Manchester, University of East Anglia,  culminating at London's O2 Brixton Academy.

2018 South African Tour
On March 29, 2018, Bowling for Soup played a show at Hillcrest Quarry in Cape Town South Africa, followed by another show on the March 30, 2018, at Rumour's Rock City  in Johannesburg, South Africa. This marked the first time Bowling for Soup toured South Africa.

2020 Together Again – You’re Welcome Tour
In February 2020, Bowling For Soup headlined the "Together Again – You're Welcome" Tour in the UK, bringing along Simple Plan as direct support. This was the first tour the two bands had done together since 2003. The sold-out tour included the band's first time selling out London's famed O2 Brixton Academy.

2022 Back For The Attack Tour
In March 2022, it was announced that Bowling for Soup was headlining a tour along with ska acts Less Than Jake and The Aquabats and would be touring throughout the summer of 2022.

Associations

Bowling for Soup's hit song "1985" was originally written by SR-71's Mitch Allan. According to Reddick, Allan showed the song to him and instructed him to take it as his own, as it seemed more of a Bowling for Soup song than an SR-71 song. Bowling for Soup worked closely with the alternative band Army of Freshmen. In the video for "High School Never Ends" the boy clapping can be seen wearing an Army of Freshmen T-shirt, and Army of Freshmen themselves can be seen as part of the BFS Marching Band. Reddick does guest vocals on four tracks on Army of Freshmen's album Under the Radar.

In 2003, fellow Texan punk rockers Junior opened for Bowling for Soup when the group played the club Trees in Deep Ellum. Reddick later co-wrote the song "She's So Amazing" for the band's album Are We Famous Yet?, and lends vocals as well. The Irish pop rock singer Lesley Roy lend her vocals for Bowling for Soup's song "Much More Beautiful Person" from the album The Great Burrito Extortion Case. Both Roy and Bowling for Soup were assigned to the same record label. Reddick is friends with MC Lars, and has lent his vocals for MC Lars' single "Download This Song". MC Lars was a part of Reddick's label Crappy Records. In 2009, Bowling for Soup cameoed in the music video "Telephone Operator" by The Leftovers, who were also a part of Crappy Records.

In 2001, Bowling for Soup performed the theme song for the Nickelodeon film Jimmy Neutron: Boy Genius. The group's version of the theme was based on the previously written television series theme song written by Brian Causey of Man Or Astro-man?. Also in 2001, Reddick wrote the lyrics for "Greatest Day" for the film Max Keeble's Big Move while the band did the music. Bowling for Soup also performed the theme "Today is Gonna Be a Great Day" for the Disney Channel cartoon Phineas and Ferb, Reddick stars in the episode "Dude, We're Getting the Band Back Together" where he is the lead vocalist of a fictional band called "Love Händel". The band itself also appeared in animated form in the episode "Phineas and Ferb's Quantum Boogaloo" in which the band performed an alternate version of the show's theme with Phineas and Ferb for their futuristic nephews. On Cartoon Network, Reddick and Chandler both played an acoustic show in 2006. And in August 2008 Reddick and Chandler filmed an exclusive video for Total Guitar magazine in the UK called "How To Write A Song In 5 Minutes". In 2008,  Reddick teamed up with SEGA to work on the theme song for Sonic Unleashed, titled "Endless Possibility".

New Zealand band 48May ran into legal issues and decided to take the song "Leather and Tattoos" off of the group's debut album. The album was replaced with a "tour edition" of the CD with the questionable song missing. The melody was very similar to "Punk Rock 101".

In 2006, Bowling for Soup covered Fergie's "London Bridge" for Pepsi Smash Cover Art on Yahoo! videos.

In 2008, Reddick co-arranged co-wrote and produced the singles "SUV" and "Girls + Summer = Fun!" with solo artist Christy Darlington, and Erik Chandler and Gary Wiseman performed on the recordings as well. These songs were subsequently released digitally. This collaboration resulted from Bowling for Soup and Darlington having performed concerts together and knowing each other since the late 1990s in the Dallas music scene and mutual respect and appreciation for each other's music.

In 2014 Bowling for Soup covered the Green Day song "St. Jimmy" for the album Kerrang! Does Green Day's American Idiot.

Greenmount (2017)

Lead vocalist Reddick provided vocals on the Lakesick track "Greenmount" as the theme song for the stoner adventure comedy of the same name. Greenmount stars Shane Kippel (star of Degrassi: The Next Generation) alongside creator Joshua Prior (who also fronts Lakesick), and John Donahue. Greenmount was released in June 2019.

Music videos
It became a running gag in Bowling for Soup's music videos to feature previous songs of the band as an introduction for the video. This can be seen in "Girl All the Bad Guys Want", "Emily", and "High School Never Ends", which feature music from "The Bitch Song", "Girl All the Bad Guys Want", and "1985" respectively.

Band members

Current members
 Jaret Reddick – lead vocals, guitar (1994–present)
 Chris Burney – guitar, backing vocals (1994–present)
 Gary Wiseman – drums, percussion, occasional studio backing vocals (1998–present)
 Rob Felicetti – bass, backing vocals, acoustic guitar (2019–present); drums (touring guest 2012); guitar (touring guest 2013); drums, percussion (touring substitute 2017, 2022); bass, backing vocals (touring substitute 2018)

Former members
 Lance Morrill – drums, percussion, occasional studio backing vocals (1994–1998); drums (touring guest 2009, 2014, 2019)
 Erik Chandler – bass, backing vocals, acoustic guitar (1994–2019)

Touring substitutes
 Kelly Ogden – bass, backing vocals (2022); vocals (touring guest 2010, 2012, 2015, 2016, 2018); vocals, bass (touring guest 2012)
 Taylor Carroll – drums, percussion (2022)
 Kevin Baldes – bass, backing vocals (2022)

Timeline

Discography

Bowling for Soup (1994)
Rock on Honorable Ones!! (1998)
Let's Do It for Johnny!! (2000)
Drunk Enough to Dance (2002)
A Hangover You Don't Deserve (2004)
The Great Burrito Extortion Case (2006)
Sorry for Partyin' (2009)
Fishin' for Woos (2011)
Lunch. Drunk. Love. (2013)
Drunk Dynasty (2016)
Pop Drunk Snot Bread (2022)

References

External links
 
 Burning Stars interview with Reddick – 2002

Rock music groups from Texas
Pop punk groups from Texas
Musical groups established in 1994
1994 establishments in Texas
Jive Records artists
RCA Records artists
Sony BMG artists
Zomba Group of Companies artists
Musical quartets
Musical groups from Denton, Texas
American punk rock groups